Lahirugama Grama Niladhari Division is a Grama Niladhari Division of the Seethawaka Divisional Secretariat of Colombo District of Western Province, Sri Lanka. It has Grama Niladhari Division Code 442D.

Lahirugama is a surrounded by the Pelpola, Digana, Hingurala, Ilukovita, Kadugoda North, Kadugoda South, Welikanna and Mambula Grama Niladhari Divisions.

Demographics

Ethnicity 
The Lahirugama Grama Niladhari Division has a Sinhalese majority (74.0%) and a significant Indian Tamil population (23.3%). In comparison, the Seethawaka Divisional Secretariat (which contains the Lahirugama Grama Niladhari Division) has a Sinhalese majority (88.2%)

Religion 
The Lahirugama Grama Niladhari Division has a Buddhist majority (67.1%) and a significant Hindu population (23.9%). In comparison, the Seethawaka Divisional Secretariat (which contains the Lahirugama Grama Niladhari Division) has a Buddhist majority (81.5%)

References 

Grama Niladhari Divisions of Seethawaka Divisional Secretariat